Gorham Academy was a preparatory school for boys and girls in Gorham, Maine.

Origins
In 1802, Hon. Stephen Longfellow presented a petition in favor of an academy in Gorham to the Massachusetts State Legislature.  Governor Caleb Strong approved an act incorporating the Academy on March 5, 1803.  The academy was to be for education of both sexes.  The first meeting of the Board of Trustees was on June 1 of the same year, and on the 23rd of June, the legislature granted a half-township of land to the academy.

In September 1806, work on the Federal style Academy Building, designed by Samuel Elder, was completed.  Reuben Nason was inaugurated as the first preceptor, and 45 boys were admitted.  15 girls were admitted in the following year, and the total number of students was raised to 75.

Closing
The academy was incorporated into the Gorham Normal School in the late 1870s, and the Academy Building is now on the campus of the University of Southern Maine. In 1973, it was listed on the National Register of Historic Places for its fine Federal period architecture and its importance in local education.

List of Preceptors
Reuben Nason, 1806-1810
Dr. Charles Coffin, 1810-1811
Asa Reddington, Jr., 1811-?
William White, ?-1815
Reuben Nason, 1815-1834
John V. Beane, 1834-?
Rev. Amos Brown, ?-1847
Edward P. Weston, 1847-1860
Josiah B. Webb, 1861-?

References

Educational institutions established in 1803
Education in Cumberland County, Maine
University of Southern Maine
Defunct schools in Maine